Callionima pan is a species of moth in the family Sphingidae. It was originally described by Pieter Cramer in 1779.

Distribution 
It is found from Mexico, Guatemala and Costa Rica through Venezuela to southern Brazil.

Description 
The wingspan is about 64 mm. There are probably two to three generations per year, with adults on wing from April to June and from October to January in Costa Rica.

Biology 
The larvae probably feed on Apocynaceae species.

Subspecies
Callionima pan pan
Callionima pan neivai Oiticica Filho, 1940 (Brazil)

References

P
Moths of Central America
Sphingidae of South America
Moths described in 1779